The Grampians Trophy is a new addition to the WTA Tour in 2021. This tournament was created for players who had originally intended to participate in the 2021 Yarra Valley Classic or the 2021 Gippsland Trophy, but were forced to undergo strict quarantine measures upon arrival in Australia due to confirmed COVID-19 cases found on several of the chartered player flights to Australia.

Due to a delayed schedule because of a COVID-19 case at a tournament quarantine hotel and the semifinals taking place just one day before the start of the Australian Open, the final was not played. This meant that both the finalists Anett Kontaveit and Ann Li received the finalist's prize money of US$33,520 and the finalist's ranking points of 305 points, not "the prize money they would have pocketed from winning the title outright".

Seeds

Draw

Finals

Final not played due to schedule delays. Both Kontaveit and Li received the finalist's points (305) and prize money (US$33,520).

Top half

Bottom half

References

External links
Main Draw

Grampians Trophy - Singles